The Look of Love is an album by jazz saxophonist Stanley Turrentine recorded for the Blue Note label in 1968 and arranged by Duke Pearson and Thad Jones.

Reception

AllMusic awarded the album 4 stars with the review by Stephen Cook stating, "With his flexible phrasing and muscular tone, Turrentine dives into the lush arrangements... Purists who usually cringe at late-'60s jazz dates like this (yes, there is a Beatles cover here) might be pleasantly surprised. For those who feel Bacharach and Jimmy Webb provide fine material for jazz, then The Look of Love is a must".

Track listing
 "The Look of Love" (Burt Bacharach, Hal David) - 4:23
 "Here, There and Everywhere" (John Lennon, Paul McCartney) - 3:26
 "A Beautiful Friendship" (Donald Kahn, Stanley Styne) - 3:22
 "Blues for Stan" (Turrentine) - 6:01
 "This Guy's in Love With You" (Bacharach, David) - 2:34
 "MacArthur Park" (Jimmy Webb) - 4:41
 "I'm Always Drunk in San Francisco" (Tommy Wolf) - 2:25
 "Emily" (Johnny Mandel, Johnny Mercer) - 3:14
 "Cabin in the Sky" (Vernon Duke, John La Touche) - 3:43
 "Smile" (Charlie Chaplin) - 3:23

Recorded on April 15, 1968 (1, 4, 10), May 2, 1968 (3, 5, 7-8) and May 13, 1968 (2, 6, 9), with string section overdubbed on May 27, 1968.

Personnel
Stanley Turrentine - tenor saxophone
Jimmy Nottingham, Snooky Young - flugelhorn
Benny Powell - bass trombone
Jim Buffington - French horn
Hank Jones - piano (tracks 3–5, 7, 8 & 10)
Duke Pearson - piano (track 1), arranger (track 1-3 & 5–9)
Roland Hanna - piano (tracks 2, 6 & 9)
Kenny Burrell - guitar
George Duvivier - bass
Grady Tate - drums (tracks 1, 3–5, 7, 8 & 10)
Mickey Roker - drums (tracks 2, 6 & 9)
Thad Jones - arranger (tracks 4 & 10)

References

1968 albums
Stanley Turrentine albums
Blue Note Records albums
Albums arranged by Duke Pearson
Albums recorded at Van Gelder Studio